Håvard Kjærstad (born 1947) is a Norwegian businessperson.

He graduated from BI Norwegian Business School in 1972 with a degree in business economy. He was employed at Esso in 1970 and is currently Nordic Retail Sales Manager. He is also chairman of the board at the Norwegian Petroleum Institute.

Kjærstad has a fortune of $1.22 million.

References
Esso

1947 births
Living people
Norwegian businesspeople
People in the petroleum industry
BI Norwegian Business School alumni